Remember (stylized as R∃/MEMBER) is the third studio album by Hiroyuki Sawano's vocal project SawanoHiroyuki[nZk]. It was released on March 6, 2019, through the Sony Music label Sacra Music. Four singles were released from the album: "Binary Star", "Cage", "narrative" and "NOISEofRAIN".

Background
"Binary Star" was used at the opening theme for the anime Legend of the Galactic Heroes: Die Neue These – Encounter, while "Cage" was used at the theme song for the life-sized Unicorn Gundam statue from Mobile Suit Gundam Unicorn.

"narrative" was used as the theme song for the anime film Mobile Suit Gundam Narrative.

"ME & CREED <nZkv>" will be used as the theme song for the upcoming mobile game Blue Exorcist: Damned Chord.

Track listing
 

Sample credits
"Binary Star" features a sample from "Nothing's Gonna Stop Us Now" written by Albert Hammond and Diane Warren and performed by Starship.

Charts

Credits
Adapted from booklet.
Production
Hiroyuki Sawano – producer, arranger
Mitsunori Aizawa – recording engineer, mixing engineer & Pro Tools operator
Junpei Ohno – recording engineer (only on track #1)
Yasuhiko Miyasaka – recording engineer (only on track #2)
Hiromitsu Takasu – recording engineer (only on track #4)
Masatake Ohsato – recording engineer (only on track #6)
Ayaka Toki – recording engineer (only on track #8)
Satoshi Morishige – recording engineer (only on track #9)
Eriko Ijima – assistant engineer 
Yosuke Maeda – assistant engineer
Hiroshi Manabe – assistant engineer
Ayumu Musha – assistant engineer
Sora Tamiya – assistant engineer
Yuji Chinone – mastering
Ryotaro Kawashima – art direction & design
Taichi Nishimaki – photographer
Junko Fukuda – hair & make-up
Yuka Moriyama – Stylist for cover
Reina Chida – products coordination
Toru Takeuchi – A&R in chief
Tomoyo Yamazaki – A&R
Koichi Baba – A&R
SME Records Promotion Room – media promotion
Yu Tsuzuki – sales promotion
Keiichi Tonomura – supervise
VV-ALKLINE Inc. – management
Daisuke Katsurada – executive producer

Vocals
Aimer – vocals (track #5)
Akihito Okano – vocals (track #2)
ASCA – vocals (track #9)
Gemie – vocals (track #11), background vocals (track #1, 2, 3, 5, 7, 8, 11)
LiSA – vocals (track #4)
mizuki – vocals (track #11)
naNami – vocals (track #11), background vocals (track #8)
Sayuri – vocals (track #8)
Takanori Nishikawa – vocals (track #6)
Takuya Ohashi – vocals (track #3)
Tielle – vocals (tracks #10, 11), background vocals (track #1, 2, 3, 5)
Uru – vocals (track #7)
Yosh – vocals (tracks #1, 11)
Hiroyuki Sawano – background vocals (tracks #1, 2, 3, 5, 7, 8, 11)
Akiko – background vocals (tracks #1, 2, 3, 5, 8, 11)
Benjamin – background vocals (tracks #1, 2, 3, 5, 7, 8, 11)
Miho Matsumoto – background vocals (track #8)
mpi – background vocals (tracks #1, 2, 3, 5, 7, 8, 11)
Rie – background vocals (track #7)
Ruka – background vocals (track #7)
Instruments
Harutoshi Ito – guitar (tracks #2, 3, 5, 7, 8, 9, 10, 11)
Hiroyuki Sawano – piano (tracks #1, 2, 4-11), keyboards (all tracks), all other instruments (all tracks)
Hiroshi Iimuro – guitar (tracks #1, 3-4, 6)
Koichiro Muroya – violin (track #4)
Koichiro Muroya Strings – strings (track #7)
Shintaro Tokita – piano (track #3)
SUGIZO – violin (track #1)
Toshino Tanabe – bass (all tracks)
Yu "masshoi" Yamauchi – drums (all tracks)

References

External links
Official website

2019 albums
Hiroyuki Sawano albums
Pop albums by Japanese artists
Pop rock albums by Japanese artists